Mohamed Youcef Belaïli (born 14 March 1992) is an Algerian professional footballer who plays as a left winger for  club Ajaccio and the Algeria national team.

Early life
Belaïli was born on 14 March 1992 in Oran. He started playing young with RCG Oran and after with MC Oran.

Club career

The beginning of the march, then to Espérance de Tunis
Youcef Belaïli started his football career with RCG Oran, then moved to the reserve team of MC Oran, Belaïli their first season in the Division 1 was with CA Bordj Bou Arreridj, and their first match was on 6 March 2010 against MC El Eulma as a substitute, and after only one season, Belaïli returned to MC Oran for two seasons. In the first season, Belaïli began to impose himself and his first goal was against USM Alger on 27 November 2010, and in the second season Belaïli became an essential piece and required by several clubs inside and outside the country. On 24 May 2012, Belaïli traveled to Tunisia to negotiate a move to Tunisian club Espérance de Tunis. Two days later, he announced that he had agreed to personal terms with the club and would be signing a three-year contract in the upcoming days. On 5 June, Belaïli officially joined Espérance, signing a three-year contract worth €2 million. On 20 July, Belaïli made his debut for Espérance as a substitute against ASO Chlef in the group stage of the 2012 CAF Champions League. Coming on in the 77th minute, Belaïli won his team a penalty to level the score and then provided an assist for Yannick N'Djeng in injury time to help Espérance win the game., and despite his coming at the end of the 2011–12 season and played only three matches, but he won the first title in his history and it was the Tunisian Ligue Professionnelle 1.

Return to Algeria and suspended by CAF
On 14 June 2014, Belaïli joined USM Alger in a contract for two seasons for a monthly salary of 5 million dinars as the highest salary in the Algerian Ligue Professionnelle 1. Belaïli was one of the stars because of his high technical skills and led the club to valuable victories, especially against JS Kabylie where he scored the winning goal in the last minutes in a match that had an unfortunate end with the death of the player Albert Ebossé Bodjongo who was struck on the head by a projectile thrown by an unknown person while the teams were leaving the field. Belaïli for having tested positive for Cocaine during an anti-doping control carried out during the match against MC El Eulma on 7 August 2015 counting for the CAF Champions League. A four-year suspension is imposed on him by Confederation of African Football, his contract with USM Alger is terminated in the wake. On 4 November 2016, the Court of Arbitration for Sport in Lausanne announced that it had decided to reduce Blaili’s sentence to two years, adding that the player smoked Hookah two days before the match without being aware of its content, noting that he did not commit any error or noticeable negligence. A year later, Belaïli joined Angers SCO in Ligue 1. but the experience was not successful as he only played one match in the Coupe de la Ligue.

Heading to the Gulf and then to Europe
On 26 January 2018, Belaïli decided to leave and return to his former club Espérance de Tunis. His return was successful by all standards and was behind his return to the Algeria national football team, either at the level of titles won five of them including two consecutive titles in the CAF Champions League. After winning the Africa Cup of Nations with the national team. Belaïli decided to take a new experience this time with Al Ahli of Saudi Arabia for three seasons in a deal that exceeded three million dollars. but it was not successful as he did not adapt there to decide to leave to join the neighbor Qatar SC. There Belaïli found his features where he scored 13 goals, including a hat-trick against Al-Ahli which is the first in his football career. In the FIFA Arab Cup and after the end of the match against Morocco, the father of Youcef Belaïli, who is his manager, announced the termination of the contract by mutual consent. On 1 February 2022, Brest announced the signing of Belaïli on a six-months deal, including an option to extend for another three years. On 29 September 2022, Belaïli was released from the club after having his contract mutually terminated. On 12 October 2022, Belaïli joined French Ligue 1 club Ajaccio for the remainder of the season.

International career

Youth 
Belaili was called up for Algeria U23 to participate in the 2010 UNAF U-23 Tournament. On 13 December 2010, he scored an own goal in the 54th minute against the Cameroon U23s. On 16 November 2011, he was selected as part of Algeria's squad for the 2011 CAF U-23 Championship in Morocco.

Senior 
Belaili was a key member of the Algeria squad that won the 2019 African Cup of Nations.

In 2021, Belaili was named in the squad of players to play in the 2021 FIFA Arab Cup in Qatar. In the quarter-finals against Morocco, Belaili scored a volley from 40 yards in extra time to give his side a 2–1 lead. In the semi-final against Qatar, Belaili scored a penalty rebound after 15 minutes of injury time to secure Algeria's place in the final.

Doping ban
In September 2015, Youcef Belaïli is suspended by Confederation of African Football for 2 years for having tested positive for Cocaine during an anti-doping control carried out during the match against MC El Eulma on 7 August 2015 counting for the CAF Champions League. He admits the facts, Bellaili is tested a second time positive for doping after consuming a prohibited product (Cocaine), during his team's match against CS Constantine counting for the fifth round of the Ligue Professionnelle 1, played on 19 September 2015 in Constantine. A four-year suspension is imposed on him, his contract with USM Alger is terminated in the wake. However, in March 2016, FIFA confirmed they were giving an extended four-year ban to apply worldwide through 19 September 2019.

Career statistics

Club

International

Scores and results list Algeria's goal tally first, score column indicates score after each Belaïli goal.

Honours
Espérance de Tunis
Tunisian Ligue Professionnelle 1: 2011–12, 2013–14, 2017–18, 2018–19
CAF Champions League: 2018, 2019
Tunisian Super Cup: 2019

Algeria U23
UNAF U-23 Tournament: 2010

Algeria
FIFA Arab Cup: 2021
Africa Cup of Nations: 2019

Individual
African Inter-Club Player of the Year: 2019
FIFA Arab Cup Silver Ball: 2021

References

External links

 
 

Living people
1992 births
Footballers from Oran
Association football wingers
Algerian footballers
Algerian Ligue Professionnelle 1 players
Saudi Professional League players
Qatar Stars League players
Ligue 1 players
CA Bordj Bou Arréridj players
RCG Oran players
MC Oran players
Espérance Sportive de Tunis players
USM Alger players
Angers SCO players
Al-Ahli Saudi FC players
Qatar SC players
Stade Brestois 29 players
AC Ajaccio players
Expatriate footballers in France
Expatriate footballers in Tunisia
Expatriate footballers in Saudi Arabia
Expatriate footballers in Qatar
Algerian expatriate sportspeople in France
Algerian expatriate sportspeople in Tunisia
Algerian expatriate sportspeople in Saudi Arabia
Algerian expatriate sportspeople in Qatar
Algerian expatriate footballers
Algeria international footballers
Algerian sportspeople in doping cases
Algeria under-23 international footballers
Algeria youth international footballers
Doping cases in association football
2011 CAF U-23 Championship players
2019 Africa Cup of Nations players
2021 Africa Cup of Nations players
21st-century Algerian people